Grapevine-Main Street station, also known as Main Street Depot, is a train station in Grapevine, Texas. The station is currently served by the TEXRail commuter rail line and the Grapevine Vintage Railroad.

Services

TEXRail
The Main Street station was an opening day station when revenue service began on January 10, 2019. The mayor of Grapevine remarked that he wanted the station to look like Fort Worth Central Station, another station on the TEXRail route that currently serves Amtrak trains and the Trinity Railway Express commuter rail line.

Grapevine Vintage Railroad
The Grapevine Vintage Railroad (GVRR) calls at a historic platform at Main Street station directly adjacent to the TEXRail platforms before continuing along the 21-mile (34 kilometer) Cotton Belt Corridor through to the Fort Worth Stockyards.

Gallery

References

External links
TEX Rail
Trinity Metro Station Concept

TEXRail stations
Railway stations in the United States opened in 2019
2019 establishments in Texas
Railway stations in the United States opened in 1888
1888 establishments in Texas
Railway stations in Tarrant County, Texas